Luxiaria is a genus of moths in the family Geometridae first described by Francis Walker in 1860.

Description
Palpi obliquely porrect (extending forward), where the second joint roughly scaled. Antennae minutely ciliated. Hind tibia of male dilated and with a longitudinal fold containing a ridge of silken hair. Forewings produced and somewhat acute at apex. Vein 3 from angle of cell and veins 7, 8 and 9 stalked, from upper angle. Vein 10 absent and vein 11 free.

Selected species
Luxiaria amasa (Butler, 1878)
Luxiaria mitorrhaphes Prout, 1925
Luxiaria phyllosaria Walker, 1860

References

External links

Ennominae